The following list is a discography of production credited to Prince Paul, an American hip hop record producer and recording artist from Amityville, New York. It includes a list of songs produced, co-produced and remixed by year, artist, album and title.

1986

Stetsasonic - On Fire 
(Produced with Stetsasonic.)
 01. "4 Ever My Beat"
 02. "My Rhyme"
 03. "Just Say Stet"
 04. "Faye"
 05. "4 Ever My Mouth"
 06. "Rock De La Stet"
 07. "Go Stetsa I"
 08. "On Fire"
 09. "Bust That Groove"
 10. "Paul's Groove"

1988

Stetsasonic - In Full Gear 
 01. "In Full Gear"
 06. "Pen & Paper"
 07. "Music for the Stetfully Insane"
 08. "We're the Band" (co-produced by Daddy-O)
 09. "Rollin' wit Rush" (co-produced by Daddy-O)
 12. "Sally"
 13. "Talkin' All that Jazz"
 16. "Miami Bass" (co-produced by Daddy-O)

MC Lyte – Lyte as a Rock 
 04. "MC Lyte Likes Swingin'"

1989

De La Soul - 3 Feet High and Rising 
(Produced with De La Soul.)
 01. "Intro"
 02. "The Magic Number"  
 03. "Change in Speak"
 04. "Cool Breeze on the Rocks" 
 05. "Can U Keep a Secret" 
 06. "Jenifa Taught Me (Derwin's Revenge)"  
 07. "Ghetto Thang" 
 08. "Transmitting Live from Mars"
 09. "Eye Know" 
 10. "Take It Off"
 11. "A Little Bit of Soap" 
 12. "Tread Water"
 13. "Potholes in My Lawn"
 14. "Say No Go"  
 15. "Do as De La Does"
 16. "Plug Tunin' (Last Chance to Comprehend)"
 17. "De La Orgee"
 18. "Buddy" (featuring Jungle Brothers and Q-Tip)
 19. "Description"
 20. "Me Myself and I" 
 21. "This Is a Recording 4 Living in a Fulltime Era (L.I.F.E.)"
 22. "I Can Do Anything (Delacratic)" 
 23. "D.A.I.S.Y. Age"
 24. "Plug Tunin'" (Original 12" version)

Big Daddy Kane – It's a Big Daddy Thing 
 01. "It's a Big Daddy Thing" 
 10. "Ain't No Stoppin' Us Now"

Queen Latifah – All Hail the Queen 
 02. "Mama Gave Birth to the Soul Children" (feat. De La Soul)

3rd Bass – The Cactus Album 
 04. "The Gas Face"
 17. "Brooklyn-Queens" (produced with Pete Nice)

1990

Chill Rob G – Ride the Rhythm 
 12. "Let Me Show You (Remix)" (remixed with Pasemaster Mase)

Groove B Chill – Starting From Zero 
 04. "Let it Roll"
 09. "Top of the Hill"

Big Daddy Kane – Taste of Chocolate 
 03. "It's Hard Being the Kane" 
 06. "No Damn Good"

Black Rock & Ron – You Can't Do Me None 12" 
 B1. "You Can't Do Me None (Prince Paul Remix)"

Jaz-O – To Your Soul 
 02. "It's that Simple" (feat. Jay-Z)
 04. "Abnormal"

Boo Yaa Tribe – Psy-ko Funk 
 A1. "Psyko Funk (Remix)"

1991

De La Soul - De La Soul Is Dead 
(Produced with De La Soul.)
 01. "Intro" 
 02. "Oodles of O's" 
 03. "Talkin' Bout Hey Love"
 04. "Pease Porridge" 
 05. "Skit 1"
 06. "Johnny's Dead AKA Vincent Mason (Live from the BK Lounge)"  
 07. "A Roller Skating Jam Named "Saturdays"" (featuring Q-Tip and Vinia Mojica)
 08. "WRMS' Dedication to the Bitty"
 09. "Bitties in the BK Lounge" 
 10. "Skit 2" 
 11. "My Brother's a Basehead" (featuring Squirrell and Preacher)
 12. "Let, Let Me In"
 13. "Afro Connections at a Hi 5 (In the Eyes of the Hoodlum)"
 14. "Rap de Rap Show"  
 15. "Millie Pulled a Pistol on Santa" 
 16. "Who Do U Worship?"
 17. "Skit 3" 
 18. "Kicked out the House"
 19. "Pass the Plugs"
 20. "Not Over till the Fat Lady Plays the Demo"
 21. "Ring Ring Ring (Ha Ha Hey)"
 22. "WRMS: Cat's in Control"
 23. "Skit 4"
 24. "Shwingalokate"
 25. "Fanatic of the B Word"
 26. "Keepin' the Faith" 
 27. "Skit 5"

Stetsasonic – Blood, Sweat & No Tears 
 03. "Uda Man"
 06. "Blood, Sweat & no Tears"
 12. "Your Mother Has Green Teeth"
 16. "Paul's a Sucker"
 00. "To Whom it May Concern" [cassette exclusive track]
 00. "Walkin' in the Rain" [cassette exclusive track]

Nikki D – Daddy's Little Girl 
 12. "Freak Accident"

3rd Bass – Derelicts of Dialect 
(Produced with 3rd Bass.)
 02. "Derelicts of Dialect" 
 10. "Herbalz in Your Mouth" 
 13. "Come In" 
 14. "No Static at All" 
 20. "Green Eggs and Swine"

Resident Alien – It Takes a Nation of Suckers to Let Us In (shelved) 
 01. "Intro"
 02. "The Resident Alien"
 03. "I Yam What I Yam"
 04. "The Ox Tail, the Burger & Chic"
 05. "Miss Lee"
 06. "Shakey Ground" (feat. Dres and Maseo) 
 07. "Ardicle Don"
 08. "Horrorscope"
 09. "Midtro"
 10. "Ooh the Dew Doo Man"
 11. "Mr. Boops"
 12. "Alone"
 13. "State of Emergency"
 14. "Are You Ready"
 15. "We Na Play"
 16. "Wanna Be (Russell)"
 17. "Mother's Day"
 18. "Third World"
 19. "Extro"
 20. "Welcome to America"

1992

Cypress Hill - Latin Lingo 12" 
 A1. "Latin Lingo (Prince Paul Mix)"

Boogie Down Productions – Sex and Violence 
 03. "Drug Dealer"
 12. "Sex and Violence"
 13. "How Not to Get Jerked"

1993

De La Soul – Buhloone Mindstate 
(Produced with De La Soul.)
 01. "Intro" 
 02. "Eye Patch" 
 03. "En Focus" (featuring Shortie No Mass and Dres)
 04. "Patti Dooke" (featuring Guru, Maceo Parker, Fred Wesley and Pee Wee Ellis)
 05. "I Be Blowin'" (featuring Maceo Parker)
 06. "Long Island Wildin'" (featuring Scha Dara Parr and Takagi Kan)
 07. "Ego Trippin' (Part Two)" 
 08. "Paul's Revenge" 
 09. "3 Days Later"
 10. "Area"
 11. "I Am I Be" (featuring Maceo Parker, Fred Wesley and Pee Wee Ellis)
 12. "In the Woods" (featuring Shortie No Mass)
 13. "Breakadawn" 
 14. "Dave Has a Problem...Seriously"
 15. "Stone Age" (featuring Biz Markie)

Justin Warfield – My Field Trip to Planet 9 
 03. "Dip Dip Divin'"
 04. "K Sera Sera"
 15. "Thoughts in the Buttermilk"

Candyman – I Thought U Knew 
 02. "Sex It Up"
 09. "Return of the Candyman"

1994

Gravediggaz - 6 Feet Deep 
 01. "Just When You Thought it Was Over (Intro)"
 02. "Constant Elevation"
 03. "Nowhere to Run, Nowhere to Hide"
 04. "Defective Trip (Trippin')"
 05. "Two Cups Of Blood"
 07. "360 Questions"
 08. "1-800 Suicide"
 09. "Diary of a Madman" (co-produced by RZA and RNS)
 10. "Mommy, What's a Gravedigga?"
 11. "Bang Your Head"
 14. "Death Trap"
 16. "Rest In Peace (Outro)"
 00. "Pass the Shovel" [European bonus track]

Kurious – A Constipated Monkey demo sessions 
 00. "Rice and Beans (Freestyle)"
 00. "Catch My Drift"

Slick Rick – Behind Bars 
 01. "Behind Bars"

1995

Horror City – '95 Demo EP 12" 
 A1. "Take it How You Want It"
 A2. "Big Sha"
 B2. "Tattles Tale"
 B3. "Headbounty"

1996

Prince Paul – Psychoanalysis: What Is It? 
 01. "Introduction oo Psychoanalysis (Schizophrenia)"
 02. "Beautiful Night (Manic Psychopath)"
 03. "Open Your Mouth (Hypothalamus)"
 04. "You Made Me (A.K.C.)"
 05. "Vexual Healing (Vacillation)"
 06. "To Get a Gun"
 07. "J.O.B. – Das What Dey Is !"
 08. "The World's a Stage (A Dramady)"
 09. "Booty Clap"
 10. "The Bitch Blues (Life Experiences)"
 11. "In Your Mind (Altered States)"
 12. "Drinks (Escapism)"
 13. "Psycho Linguistics (Convergent Thought)"
 14. "That's Entertainment !? (Aversive Conditioning)"
 15. "Outroduction To Diagnosis Psychosis"
Tracks included on latter edition
 00. "Why Must You Hate Me?
 00. "Dimepieces"
 00. "2 B Blunt (A True Story)"

Various artists - America Is Dying Slowly 
 01. "No Rubber, No Backstage Pass" - performed by Biz Markie, Chubb Rock, and Prince Paul

Various artists – Macro Dub Infection Volume 2 
Disc 2
 07. "Brother No Blood" - performed by Prince Paul

Twigy – 聖戦 12" 
 A2. "聖戦Part II"

Vernon Reid – Mistaken Identity 
 02. "Mistaken Identity" (DJ scratches)

1997

Dr. Octagon – Blue Flowers CDS 
 02. "Blue Flowers (Prince Paul "So Beautiful" Mix)"

Gravediggaz – The Pick, the Sickle and the Shovel 
 12. "Hidden Emotions"
 15. "Outro"

Imani Coppola – Legend of a Cowgirl CDS 
 03. "Legend of a Cowgirl (Prince Paul Mix)"

The Ill Saint – Subterranean Hitz Vol. I 
 05. "Sucker For Love" - performed by Prince Paul

Chris Rock – Roll With The New 
 (produced full album)

1998

Metabolics – The M-Virus 
 08. "Lyrical Chemical"

Method Man – Tical 2000: Judgement Day 
 15. "You Play Too Much (Skit)"

Prince Paul - A Prince Among Thieves 
 02. "Pain"
 04. "Steady Slobbin'"
 06. "What U Got (The Demo)"
 08. "MC Hustler"
 10. "The Other Line"
 12. "Weapon World" (feat. Kool Keith)
 14. "War Party"
 16. "Macula's Theory" (feat. Big Daddy Kane)
 17. "Mr. Large" (feat. Chubb Rock and Biz Markie)
 19. "Put the Next Man On"
 22. "More Than U Know" (feat. De La Soul)
 24. "Mood For Love"
 26. "The Men in Blue" (feat. Everlast)
 28. "Handle Your Time" (feat. Sadat X, Xzibit and  Kid Creole)
 32. "You Got Shot"
 35. "A Prince Among Thieves"

1999

Various artists – MTV Celebrity Deathmatch (soundtrack) 
 08. "Secret Wars (Prince Paul Mix)" - performed by The Last Emperor

Handsome Boy Modeling School - So... How's Your Girl? 
(All tracks co-produced with Dan the Automator, except #8 co-produced with Dan the Automator and DJ Shadow.)
 01. "Rock n' Roll (Could Never Hip Hop Like This)" 
 02. "Magnetizing" (featuring Del tha Funkee Homosapien)
 03. "Metaphysical" (featuring Miho Hatori and Mike D)
 04. "Look at This Face (Oh My God They're Gorgeous)"  
 06. "Once Again (Here to Kick One for You)" (featuring Grand Puba and Sadat X)
 07. "The Truth" (featuring Róisín Murphy and J-Live)
 08. "Holy Calamity (Bear Witness II)" (featuring DJ Shadow and DJ Quest)
 09. "Calling the Biz" 
 10. "The Projects (P Jays)" (featuring Dave and Del tha Funkee Homosapien)
 11. "Sunshine" (featuring Sean Lennon, Money Mark, Father Guido Sarducci, Josh Haden, and Paula Frazer)
 12. "Modeling Sucks" 
 13. "Torch Song Trilogy" (featuring Sensational)
 14. "The Runway Song" (featuring Kid Koala)
 15. "Megaton B-Boy 2000" (featuring Alec Empire and El-P)
 16. "Father Speaks" (featuring Father Guido Sarducci)

Chris Rock – Bigger & Blacker 
 (produced full album)

J-Live – The Best Part 
 09. "Wax Paper"

2000

De La Soul - Art Official Intelligence: Mosaic Thump 
 04. "Oooh." (feat. Redman and Pharoahe Monch) (produced with De La Soul.)

Del The Funky Homosapien – Both Sides of the Brain 
 13. "Signature Slogans"

MC Paul Barman – It's Very Stimulating 
 01. "An Introduction"
 02. "The Joy of Your World"
 03. "School Anthem"
 04. "Salvation Barmy"
 05. "I'm Fricking Awesome"
 06. "Mtv Get Off the Air, part 2" (feat. Princess Superstar)

Mr. Dead – Metabolics Volume II: Dawn Of The Dead 
 06. "Dawn of the Dead"

Encore – Sporadic 12" 
 B1. "Waterworld"

2001

Tragedy Khadafi – Against All Odds 
 01. "Intro (The Conflict)"
 05. "Skit 2: The Jump Off"
 14. "Skit 3: More Thugg More Names"

Various – Coast II Coast 
 03. "Senioritis" - performed by MC Paul Barman

The Last Emperor – The Banger / The Umph 12" 
 B4. "	Monolith"

2002

Living Color - Vivid 
 12. "Funny Vibe (Funky Vibe Mix)" [2002 bonus track]

MC Paul Barman – Paullelujah! 
 05. "Bleeding Brain Grow"

The Avalanches – Since I Left You 12" 
 A1. "Since I Left You (Prince Paul Remix)"

J-Live – The Day I Fell Off / School's In 12" 
 A1. "The Day I Fell Off"

Various artists – Dexter's Laboratory - The Hip-Hop Experiment 
 07. "Back to the Lab" - performed by Prince Paul

2003

Prince Paul – Politics of the Business 
 01. "A Day in the Life" (feat. Dave Chappelle)
 02. "Popmaster Intro" (feat. Popmaster)
 03. "Make Room" (feat. Erick Sermon, Mally G and Sy Scott)
 04. "The Drive By"
 05. "So What" (feat. Masta Ace, Pretty Ugly and Kokane)  
 06. "Drama Queen" (feat. Dave and Truth Enola) 
 07. "Not Tryin' To Hear That/Words (Album Leak)" (feat. Guru and Planet Asia)
 08. "Politics of the Business" (feat. Chuck D and Ice-T)
 09. "Crhyme Pays/Ralph Nader" (feat. The Beatnuts, Tash, Tony Touch and Biz Markie)
 10. "What I Need" (feat. Kardinal Offishall and Sly Boogy)
 11. "Princepaulonline.com/The Word"
 12. "Controversial Headlines AKA Champion Sound, Pt. 1/My Bookie" (feat. Horror City)
 13. "Beautifully Absurd" (feat. W. Ellington Felton)
 14. "Controversial Headlines AKA Champion Sound, Pt. 2" (feat. Horror City and Jean Grae) 
 15. "Chubb Rock Please Pay Paul His $2200 You Owe Him (People, Places, and Things)" (feat. Chubb Rock, MF Doom and Wordsworth)
 16. "A Life in the Day"/ "Crhyme Pays" [Original Mix]/ "The Way My Life Seems"

The Last Emperor - Music, Magic, Myth 
 01. "Intro"
 18. "The Great Pretender"
 19. "Outro"

The Last Emperor – Palace Of The Pretender 
 11. "The Great Pretender"
 14. "Clear Day" (feat. Masta Ace and Trugoy the Dove)

2004

MF Doom – Mm..LeftOvers 
 05. "Hot Guacamole"

Handsome Boy Modeling School – White People 
(All tracks co-produced with Dan the Automator.)
 01. "Intro" (featuring Father Guido Sarducci)
 02. "If It Wasn't for You" (featuring De La Soul and Starchild Excalibur)
 03. "Are You Down With It" (featuring Mike Patton)
 04. "The World's Gone Mad" (featuring Del the Funky Homosapien, Barrington Levy and Alex Kapranos)
 05. "Dating Game" (featuring Tim Meadows, Hines Buchanan and Neelam)
 06. "Breakdown" (featuring Jack Johnson
 07. "It's Like That / I Am Complete" (featuring Casual and Tim Meadows)
 08. "I've Been Thinking" (featuring Cat Power)
 09. "Rock and Roll (Could Never Hip Hop Like This) Part 2 / Knockers" (featuring Lord Finesse, Mike Shinoda, Chester Bennington, Rahzel, Qbert, Grand Wizard Theodore, Jazzy Jay and Tim Meadows)
 10. "The Hours"
 11. "Class System" (featuring Pharrell and Julee Cruise)
 12. "First... and Then" (featuring Dres)
 13. "A Day in the Life / Good Hygiene" (featuring RZA, The Mars Volta, A.G. and Tim Meadows)
 14. "Greatest Mistake" (featuring John Oates and Jamie Cullum)
 15. "Dating Game Part 2" (featuring Tim Meadows, Hines Buchanan and Neelam)
 16. "Outro" (featuring Father Guido Sarducci)

2005

Chris Rock – Never Scared 
 (produced full album with Don Newkirk)

Prince Paul – Itstrumental 
 01. "MVU (Act 1)"
 02. "It's a Stick Up!"
 03. "Flattery" (featuring Steinski)
 04. "My Friend the Popmaster"
 05. "Inside Your Mind" (featuring Mr. Dead & MC Paul Barman)
 06. "El Ka Bong"
 07. "MVU (Act 2)"
 08. "Yes, I Do Love Them Ho's!"
 09. "What are You Afraid Of?"
 10. "I Want You (I'm an 80's Man)" (featuring Bimos)
 11. "Profit"
 12. "The Boston Top" (featuring Mr. Dead & Newkirk)
 13. "MVU (Act 3)"
 14. "And the Winner Is?"
 15. "Gangstas My Style"
 16. "The Night My Girlfriend Left Me" (featuring MC Paul Barman)
 17. "Live @ 5"
 18. "MVU (Final Act)"
 19. "Think or Die"

The Dix – The Art Of Picking Up Women / The Rise And The Fall Of The Dix 
 01. "Intro to Women"
 02. "Here Comes the Dix"
 03. "Tears in My Eyes (Dirty Girl)"
 04. "I Luv U Girl"
 05. "When I Come Home to You"
 06. "From the Top"
 07. "Outro To Women"

2006

De La Soul - The Impossible: Mission TV Series – Pt. 1 
 05. "What the Fuck part one (De La Soul's Poster)"
 10. "What the Fuck part two"

L.A. Symphony – CIWYW 
 11. "Broken Now"

2007

Marvin Gaye – Here, My Dear 
Disc 2 (expanded edition)
 06. "Everybody Needs Love (Alternate Version)"

Baby Elephant – How Does the Brain Wave? 
(co-produced by Don Newkirk)
 01. "How Does The Brain Wave"
 03. "Fred Berry (Instrumental)"
 04. "Cool Runnins"
 05. "Even Stranger"

Baby Elephant – Turn My Teeth Up! 
 01. "The Search (Skit)"
 05. "Master (Skit)"
 07. "Language (Skit)"
 11. "Plug (Skit)"
 14. "100 Keyboards (Skit)"
 17. "	Take Me To Brazil (Skit)"

2008

The Dino 5 – Baby Loves Hip Hop Presents The Dino 5 
 (produced full album)

2009

MC Paul Barman - Thought Balloon Mushroom Cloud 
 08. "Get Along Song"

Souls of Mischief – Montezuma's Revenge 
 01. "Intro"
 02. "Won!"
 05. "Skit"
 06. "Proper Aim"
 09. "Poets Skit"
 10. "Poets"
 11. "Mr. Freeman Skit" (co-produced by Opio) 
 12. "Fourmation"
 15. "Lickity Split"
 16. "Home Game"
 17. "Outro"
 18. "Lalala"

2014

Richard Gein – I Swear To Drunk I'm Not God 
 11. "I'm Fuckin Raw"

2015

Run the Jewels - Meow the Jewels 
 06. "Lie, Cheat, Meow (Prince Paul Remix)"

Vic Winner & Los Colegas Más Baratos – SKB Posse Presenta: The Hustling Mixtape 
 08. "I'm A Hustler"

2020

Gorillaz - Song Machine, Season One: Strange Timez 
 04. "Pac-Man"

Discographies of American artists
Hip hop discographies
Production discographies